Jerry Leger (born Gerald Micheal Leger; April 19, 1985) is a Canadian singer-songwriter. Since 2005, he has released 13 albums (7 solo, 3 credited to Jerry Leger & The Situation and 3 with his side projects, The Del Fi's and The Bop Fi's).

Leger's last three major albums Early Riser (2014), the double LP Nonsense and Heartache (2017) and Time Out For Tomorrow (2019) were produced by songwriter/musician, Michael Timmins of Cowboy Junkies and released on their record label, Latent Recordings. He has been praised by other songwriters such as Doug Paisley and Ron Sexsmith, who appeared on a couple of his albums and said, "Jerry Leger has that spark in him that all the great songwriters have. He's the real deal."

Jerry Leger has toured extensively through Canada, the US, Europe and the UK, playing headlining shows and opening for acts such as Ron Sexsmith, The Sadies, Jesse Winchester, Fred Eaglesmith, Jill Barber, Justin Townes Earle, Jim Cuddy, Deer Tick, Skydiggers, Jim Lauderdale, Dawes, Tift Merritt, Doug Paisley, among others.

Maik Brüggemeyer of Rolling Stone Magazine in the March 2018 European edition called Leger, "One of the best Canadian songwriters."

Career
Leger cut his first album when he was 19 in 2005, with frequent producer/musician, Tim Bovaconti. His sophomore record, Farewell Ghost Town, followed the next year. Produced by Don Kerr and Tim Bovaconti and featuring Ron Sexsmith on piano and Fergus Hambleton (of The Sattalites). Farewell Ghost Town was charming not only for its strong songwriting, but also in its unassuming approach.

In 2007, Leger struck up a friendship with Skydiggers co-founder, Josh Finlayson. This resulted in the 2008 album, You, Me and The Horse, co-produced by Tim Bovaconti. You, Me and The Horse garnered rave reviews and pushed Leger's career forward with appearances on the popular CBC Radio show, Q, in-sessions on the legendary WSM Radio in Nashville and The WDVX concert series, Blue Plate Special in Knoxville, TN.

The end of 2010 saw the release of Leger's 4th record, Traveling Grey. Ron Sexsmith remarked, "Traveling Grey is probably Jerry's best record so far and he hasn't made any bad ones.

Traveling Grey is Jerry Leger's fourth album and found him poised to add his name to the roll call that has built Toronto's international reputation as a singer/songwriter Mecca. During this time, Jerry appeared twice on Music City Roots, hosted by singer/songwriter, Jim Lauderdale, who called Leger a great young songwriter.

In 2011, Jerry released the digital only mini album, The Good Old Days are Back in Drag. Jason Schneider at Exclaim! said "its seven tracks crackles with the raw energy of a Sun Records single." The album artwork is a sketch by Leger.

Some Folks Know was released near the end of 2012, showcasing his longtime backing band, The Situation (James McKie, Dan Mock, Kyle Sullivan), Ron Sexsmith reprising his role on piano and a duet with Serena Ryder. Ben Rayner of The Toronto Star called the album "the works of a young gifted storyteller" and "some folks do indeed already know what he's up to. Time, Jerry. Give it time. It's coming."

In the summer of 2013, Leger met up with Michael Timmins, member and main songwriter in the legendary band, Cowboy Junkies. This resulted in the 2014 album, Early Riser, produced by Timmins and released on the Junkies' own label, Latent Recordings. All Jerry's previous albums had been released independently on his own label, Golden Rocket Records. The album has received high acclaim from Exclaim!, NOW, The Toronto Star, The Globe and Mail and CBC. Zachary Houle from PopMatters called the record, "A commanding and astounding listen" and "deserving of any laurels and accolades thrown its way."

Winter 2015, the album Crowd Pleaser by his side project, The Del Fi's was released. It was recorded live off the floor in 10 hours with 13 musicians who barely knew or didn't know the material at all. Leger wrote all the songs, with most of them being written very quickly before going into the studio to maintain a spontaneous and loose rock 'n' roll sound. Kerry Doole at Exclaim! wrote, "He regularly releases albums of a high quality, he's an engaging performer and he has earned major peer respect." Adding "The record does a fine job of capturing the vitality of his band's live show...This is a crowd-pleasing addition to a worthy discography." Another side project appeared in 2016 stemming from The Del Fi's called The Bop Fi's featuring poetry written and spoken by Leger with a backdrop of jazz, mainly in the bebop and cool jazz style.

Nonsense and Heartache, the Michael Timmins produced double album was released March 31, 2017 on Latent Recordings/Warner Music (in Canada) Proper Music (UK/Europe). It appeared on Polaris Music Prize longer list and Kyle Mullin from Exclaim! said of the album, "there's no shortage of elaborate artistry on this double LP." Leger and the album received high praise in the German edition of Rolling Stone, where Nonsense and Heartache rose to #3 on the Rolling Stone album charts in Germany. The reaction to Nonsense and Heartache brought Leger through Europe and the UK twice in 2018 including the Take Root Festival alongside Kurt Vile, Neko Case, Father John Misty, Alejandro Escovedo, Shakey Graves, John Moreland and others.

A 7-week tour in the Spring of 2019 coincided with the Europe-only release of the compilation Too Broke To Die: Retrospective 2005-2019 featuring studio cuts and two previously unreleased songs.

November 2019 saw the release of Time Out For Tomorrow with Michael Timmins producing again. It was met with positive reaction from American Songwriter, Uncut Magazine, The Bluegrass Situation and more. Maik Brüggemeyer in the German edition of Rolling Stone gave it 4.5 out of 5, praising it a masterpiece while Andrew Frolish, writing for AmericanaUK awarded it 9/10, calling it "a masterful example of Americana songcraft."

Spring 2020 was to see extensive touring behind Time Out For Tomorrow, starting with European and UK dates but all activity was halted due to the COVID-19 pandemic. Soon after the first “stay at home” lockdown in Toronto, Leger released the surprise album Songs From The Apartment in late March. A collection of lo-fi recordings recorded with one microphone in his Toronto apartment were originally used for demonstration purposes soon or immediately after a song was written. All of the songs had previously never been heard by the public except for a version of “You & Louise” by Leger's side project, The Del Fi's. Leger explained in a press release, “All shows were cancelled or postponed and it was almost therapeutic for me getting this record together. It also went from being just a surprise record for the fans at a difficult time for all of us, to becoming a favourite of mine. I like having an album like this, completely solo, when you can hear songs recorded at home right after they were written. Not knowing if anyone beyond myself would hear it. It naturally allows a relaxed and uninhibited performance.” 

In August 2020, Leger released the single “Halfway 'Til Gone”, a duet with Don Stevenson from the legendary 1960's San Francisco group Moby Grape, produced by Tim Bovaconti. Jedd Beaudoin, writing for PopMatters said, “the tune is a subtle but important reminder of Leger's prowess with the pen.”  In the fall of that year, his first self-published collection of poetry titled Just The Night Birds was released. 

January 21, 2021, the new single “Jumped In The Humber” produced by Michael Timmins and featuring Leger's band The Situation, was released. Along with it came news of a limited vinyl release of Songs From The Apartment and a Deluxe Edition of Time Out For Tomorrow, both slated for a March 26, 2021 release date.

Discography
2005: Jerry Leger & the Situation
2006: Farewell Ghost Town
2008: You, Me and the Horse
2010: Traveling Grey
2011: The Good Old Days Are Back in Drag (mini-album)
2012: Some Folks Know
2013: Live on Stage (initially only available at live shows)
2014: Early Riser
2015: Rusty but Workin (split single with Graham Nicholas)
2015: Crowd Pleaser (with the Del Fi's)
2016: Don't Lose Your Beauty (with the Bop Fi's)
2017: Nonsense and Heartache
2018: Residuals (with the Del Fi's)
2019: Too Broke to Die: Retrospective 2005-2019
2019: Time Out for Tomorrow
2020: Songs from the Apartment (surprise album)
2020: Halfway 'Til Gone (single ft. Don Stevenson)
2021: Jumped in the Humber (single)
2022: Nothing Pressing

References

1985 births
Living people
Canadian pop singers
Canadian male singer-songwriters
Canadian singer-songwriters
Musicians from Toronto
21st-century Canadian male singers